The 2022 European Cross Country Championships was the 28th edition of the cross country running competition for European athletes. It was held on 11 December 2022 in La Mandria Park near Turin, Italy.

Italy became the first country to have staged the European Cross Country Championships on four occasions after previous editions in Ferrara in 1998, San Giorgio su Legnano in 2006 and Chia in 2016. Initially Turin received the right to host the event in 2021. However, due to the coronavirus pandemic and cancellation of the 2020 championship, which was supposed to be staged by Dublin, the organizers of the Turin championship agreed to hold them in Italy in 2022, so that the 2021 event could be hosted by the Irish city.

The looped course featured a steep 300 metre uphill and downhill section and a 50 metre-long indoor section through the carriage pavilion of La Mandria Castle (:it:Castello della Mandria), part of the UNESCO World Heritage Site since 1997, on each long lap.

Both Norwegians Jakob Ingebrigtsen and Karoline Bjerkeli Grøvdal successfully defended their men's and women's senior titles from Fingal-Dublin 2021 respectively. It was Ingebrigtsen's sixth consecutive European cross country title after four victories at under-20 level. Grøvdal earned her ninth individual medal, an unsurpassed record by a female athlete in the meet history; it was her third gold after U20 success in 2009.

Both Great Britain's Charles Hicks and Italy's Nadia Battocletti defended their men's and women's U23 titles respectively. For Battocletti it was a fourth consecutive continental cross country victory.

Great Britain and Northern Ireland topped the medal table with 10 medals, including five golds.

Medal summary

Note: Athletes in italics did not score for the team result.

Medal table

Results

Senior men

Senior women

U23 men

References

European Cross Country Championships
European Cross Country Championships
European Cross Country Championships
European Cross Country Championships
European Cross Country Championships